Antiotricha furonia is a moth of the subfamily Arctiinae. It was described by Herbert Druce in 1911. It is found in Ecuador.

References

Moths described in 1911
Arctiini
Moths of South America